Jiskra Liberec was a Czechoslovak football club from the town of Liberec, which played one season in the Czechoslovak First League. It was founded in 1922 as Rapid Horní Růžodol. The club featured in the 1955 Czechoslovak First League, finishing bottom of the league and winning only three of their 22 matches.

The club ceased to exist in 1958, following a merger with Slavoj Liberec to form a new club, Slovan Liberec.

Historical names 
 1922 – Rapid Horní Růžodol
 1945 – Rapid Liberec
 1948 – Sokol Liberec–Horní Růžodol
 1950 – Kolora Liberec
 1953 – Jiskra Kolora Liberec
 1956 – Lokomotiva Liberec
 1957 – Jiskra Sběrné suroviny Liberec
 1958 – merged with Slavoj Liberec to form Slovan Liberec

References

Football clubs in Czechoslovakia
Czechoslovak First League clubs
Association football clubs established in 1922
Association football clubs disestablished in 1958
Defunct football clubs in the Czech Republic